100,000, 100000, 10,0000, 1,00000, 1E5, 105, hundred thousand, ten myriad or variant, may refer to:

 100000 (number), the decimal number "100000" and values associated with that range and magnitude
 $100,000, a denomination of money circulated by the United States
 100,000-year problem, a climatological records problem
 Project 100,000, a Vietnam-era US Army recruiting program
 For the year 100,000 AD see Timeline of the far future

See also 
 100.000 (disambiguation)
 $100,000 infield, a period of the Philadelphia Athletics baseball club
 100,000 B.C., a television serial of Doctor Who
 100,000 Years, a KISS rock album
 The £100K Drop, a British game show formerly called The Million Pound Drop